Fleishhacker Pool was a public saltwater swimming pool complex, located in the southwest corner of San Francisco, California, United States, next to the San Francisco Zoo at Sloat Boulevard and the Great Highway. Upon its completion in 1925, it was one of the largest outdoor swimming pools in the world; it remained open for more than four decades until its closure in 1971. It was eventually demolished in 2000.

Construction  

The Fleishhacker Pool and the Fleishhacker Playfield complex were built by philanthropist and civic leader Herbert Fleishhacker in 1924, and opened on April 22, 1925. The pool measured  and held  of seawater, it accommodated 10,000 bathers and at its opening the largest swimming pool in the United States and one of the largest, (in theory), heated outdoor pools in the world. The pool was so large the lifeguards required rowboats for patrol and it was used by the military for drills and exercises. 

The pool's heater could warm  of seawater from 60 degrees to 75 degrees Fahrenheit each minute, in theory providing a constant pool water temperature of 72 degrees for AAU swim meets, but in practice tended to vary between 65 and 75 degrees, which was a chilly temperature for most swimmers.

The Mother’s Building (also known as the Delia Fleishhacker Memorial Building) was built next to the children's wading pool; the building served as a lounge for mothers and small children. The wading pool was removed in 1940; and it was replaced by the children's zoo by 1960.

Decline  

After years of underfunding and poor maintenance, the pool was showing some deterioration when a storm in January 1971 damaged its drainage pipe. Usage of the pool had been low, and the repair costs exceeded the City's budget, so the pool was converted to fresh water, resulting in poor water quality; it was closed by the end of 1971.

In 1999, the San Francisco Zoological Society was granted ownership of the pool house. The swimming pool itself was filled with rocks and gravel, with the space now serving as a parking lot for the zoo. The pool house stood derelict and occupied by wildlife and homeless people for many years, until it was destroyed by a fire on December 1, 2012. The remaining ruins were demolished, and a fragment of the pool house still exists consisting of three ornate entrances.

The only remaining structure left from the Fleishhacker Pool complex is the Mother’s Building, presently located within the San Francisco Zoo and Gardens.

References

External links
 List of 26 photos of Fleishhacker Pool at Library of Congress
 Ocean Beach Bulletin: "Before Now – Fleishhacker Pool and its 6 million gallons"
 Terrastories.com: Contemporary photos of the Fleishhacker Bath House & History of the Pool
 SFgate.com: "Shrinkage: The vanishing swimming pools of San Francisco"
 Bcx.news: "Fleishhacker Pool 1954 by San Francisco Zoo, San Francisco, California"
 Guidelines-Newsletter for San Francisco Guides and Sponsors: "Fleishhacker Pool" by James Smith
 Thiết kế xây dựng hồ bơi

Demolished buildings and structures in San Francisco
Swimming venues in San Francisco
Culture of San Francisco
Demolished buildings and structures in California
Sunset District, San Francisco
1920s architecture in the United States
Mediterranean Revival architecture in California
Buildings and structures demolished in 2000